Ak Mosque is a 19th century mosque in Khiva, Uzbekistan. It stands in Itchan Kala, the walled old city of Khiva, which is a World Heritage Site. It was built between 1838 and 1842 on older foundations. It consists of a square, domed room (6.35 x 6.35 m), surrounded on three sides by a portico (iwan). Its total size is 25.5 x 13.5 m.

References 

Mosques in Uzbekistan
Khiva